The 2015 Asia Rugby Championship, or ARC, was the inaugural tri-nations series for top-level rugby union in Asia and the twenty-eighth continental championship for the ARFU nations. The Asia Rugby Championship replaced the former Asian Five Nations in 2015, with only three nations competing in the top division instead of the previous five. The inaugural series included Hong Kong, Japan and South Korea. Other Asian nations competed in the lower division tournaments.

Instead of the single round-robin format used in the Asian Five Nations, the three teams played each other twice on a home and away basis. Japan, as the team finishing on top of the standings in 2015, was declared the winner. The bottom-placed team, Korea, was subject to a promotion-relegation play-off against the winner of the next lower division. However, Sri Lanka, who finished on top of Division 1, declined the opportunity to challenge.

Standings

Notes:
 The final match saw the Japan v Hong Kong match abandoned due to adverse weather. It was agreed that Japan and Hong Kong would share the points, with each team receiving 3 points each.

Fixtures

Week 1

Week 2

Week 3

Week 4

Week 5

Week 6

Top 3 Challenge

Due to financial reasons, the game was cancelled and South Korea remained in the Tri-nations division for 2016.

Squads

Summary

Note: Ages, caps and domestic side are of 18 April 2015 – the starting date of the tournament.

Japan
On 5 March, head coach Eddie Jones named a 31-man squad for the 2015 Asian Rugby Championship.

On 11 April, Chihito Matsui and Ryohei Yamanaka was added to the squad.

Hong Kong
Hong Kong's squad for the 2015 Asian Rugby Championship.

Adrian Griffiths was added to the squad for the Round 5 game with South Korea.

Head Coach:  Andrew Hall

South Korea
South Korea 31-man squad for the 2015 Asian Rugby Championship.

Andre Coquillard and Park Hwan were added to the squad for the Round 5 game with Hong Kong.

Head coach:  Chung Hyung Seok

See also
 2015 Asian Rugby Championship Division Tournaments

References

2015 rugby union tournaments for national teams
2015 in Asian rugby union
2015
International rugby union competitions hosted by Hong Kong
International rugby union competitions hosted by South Korea
International rugby union competitions hosted by Japan
2014–15 in Japanese rugby union
rugby union
rugby union